Summer Night (also known as Summer Night with Greek Profile, Almond Eyes and Scent of Basil) is a 1986 Italian comedy film directed by Lina Wertmüller. The film was selected as the Italian entry for the Best Foreign Language Film at the 59th Academy Awards, but was not accepted as a nominee.

Cast 
Mariangela Melato as Fulvia Block 
Michele Placido as  Beppe Catanìa
Roberto Herlitzka as  Turi Cantalamessa 
Massimo Wertmüller as  Miki 
John Steiner as  Frederick, Fulvia's lover
Arnaldo Ninchi as Fulvia's secretary

See also
 List of submissions to the 59th Academy Awards for Best Foreign Language Film
 List of Italian submissions for the Academy Award for Best Foreign Language Film

References

External links

1986 films
1986 comedy films
Italian comedy films
1980s Italian-language films
Films directed by Lina Wertmüller
1980s Italian films